Andrey Baranok (born 20 July 1979) is a Belarusian former professional footballer. He spent most of his career in FC Vitebsk.

External links

1979 births
Living people
Belarusian footballers
Association football midfielders
FC Lokomotiv Vitebsk (defunct) players
FC Gomel players
FC Vitebsk players
FC Naftan Novopolotsk players
FC ZLiN Gomel players
Sportspeople from Vitebsk